The North Seattle Journal was a community newspaper in Seattle serving the neighborhoods of Broadview, Greenwood, Crown Hill, Blue Ridge, Haller Lake, Bitter Lake, and Green Lake. It existed from the 1950s until 1974

References

Newspapers published in Seattle